Swansea West may refer to:

 Swansea West (UK Parliament constituency)
 Swansea West (Senedd constituency)